Rainmaker or The Rainmaker may refer to:

 A practitioner of rainmaking
 A practitioner of rainmaking (ritual)

Characters 
 The Rainmaker, a mysterious character in the film Looper
 Sarah Rainmaker, a fictional character from the Gen¹³ comic book series

Film and television 
 The Rainmaker (1926 film), a lost American silent film
 The Rainmaker (play), by N. Richard Nash
 The Rainmaker (1956 film), starring Burt Lancaster and Katharine Hepburn
 The Rainmaker, John Frankenheimer's 1982 television film
 The Rainmaker (novel), a novel by John Grisham
 The Rainmaker (1997 film), starring Matt Damon and Danny DeVito

Music

Albums 
 Rainmaker (Fair Warning album) (1995)
 Rainmaker (Kevin Moore album) (1980), and the title song
 Rainmaker (YFriday album) (1999), and the title song
 The Rainmaker (album) (2001), by The Flower Kings
 Rainmaker, a 1969 album by Michael Chapman

Songs 
 "Rainmaker" (Emmelie de Forest song) (2014)
 "Rainmaker" (Iron Maiden song) (2003)
 "Rainmaker", by Harry Nilsson and Bill Martin from the 1969 album Harry
 "Rainmaker", by Kansas from the 1988 album In the Spirit of Things
 "Rainmaker", by The Partridge Family from the 2001 album Sound Magazine
 "Rainmaker", by Preston Reed from the 1996 album Ladies Night
 "Rainmaker", by Sleigh Bells from the 2017 EP Kid Kruschev
 "Rainmaker", by Sparklehorse from the 1996 album Vivadixiesubmarinetransmissionplot
 "Rainmaker", by Spear of Destiny from the 1984 album One Eyed Jacks
 "Rainmaker", by Traffic from the 1971 album The Low Spark of High Heeled Boys
 "Rainmaker", by Vanden Plas from the 1997 album The God Thing
 "Rainmaker", by Wellington Womble of  The Wombles (1976)
 "Rainmaker", by Yanni from the 2003 album Ethnicity

 "Mr. Rainmaker", by Warrant from the 1990 album Cherry Pie

People 
 Boyd Melson (born 1981), American boxer
 Rainmaker, ring name of Japanese professional wrestler Kazuchika Okada

Other uses 
 Rainmaker (business), a person who brings in much new business and/or accounts
 Rainmaker Digital Effects, a digital effects studio
 The Rainmaker: a Passion for Politics, a political memoir by Keith Davey
 Rainmaker, a recurring mode in the Splatoon video game series

See also 
 The Rainmakers (disambiguation)